Kanal 4 (Channel 4) is a Danish subscription television channel operated by Warner Bros. Discovery EMEA, a subsidiary of Warner Bros. Discovery It was launched in 2006 as the successor of the former TvDanmark.

Its predecessor TvDanmark was launched in 1997 as Denmark's second nationwide commercial terrestrial channel after TV 2. It was renamed TvDanmark 2 when the sister channel TvDanmark 1 was launched. When TvDanmark 1 was renamed Kanal 5, the first channel reverted to its old name before becoming Kanal 4 in 2006. On 1 January 2007, the terrestrial Kanal 4 signals were replaced by a new channel called SBS NET, while Kanal 4 continued broadcasting by satellite and cable.

The station is broadcast to Denmark by satellite from London, showing mainly films, US and drama shows, therefore allowing for more lenient advertising rules as compared to broadcasting directly from Denmark.

References

External links
Official Kanal 4 site

Television stations in Denmark
Television channels and stations established in 2006
Warner Bros. Discovery networks
Warner Bros. Discovery EMEA